Karkamış District is a district of Gaziantep Province of Turkey. Its administrative seat is the town Karkamış. It had a population of 9,379 in 2022.

Demographics 
The district is mostly populated by Turkmens from the Barak tribe, which inhabits all villages in the district while sharing some with other groups. Arabs are also found in the town of Karkamış and two villages.

Villages 
List of villages in Karkamış District:

 Akçaköy
 Alaçalı
 Alagöz
 Arıkdere
 Ayyıldız
 Balaban
 Beşkılıç
 Çiftlik
 Eceler
 Elifoğlu
 Erenyolu
 Gürçay
 Karacurun
 Karanfil
 Kelekli
 Kepirler
 Kıvırcık
 Korkmazlar
 Kuruyazı
 Öncüler
 Örmetaş
 Savaş
 Soylu
 Subağı
 Şenlik
 Teketaşı
 Tosunlu
 Türkyurdu
 Yarımca
 Yaşar
 Yazır
 Yeşerti
 Yolağzı
 Yurtbağı
 Zührecik

References

Districts of Gaziantep Province